Philip Alexander Watt (born 10 January 1988) is an English footballer who plays for Frickley Athletic. He previously played in the Football League for Mickleover.

Career

Lincoln City
Watt joined Lincoln City in 2004 having trained as a youth player with Rotherham United. He moved to Grantham Town on loan in early 2006, before being promoted to the first team squad in July 2006. He soon moved on loan again to Grantham for a month, playing ten matches in total for the club.

In May 2007, he was one of seven players offered a new contract by manager John Schofield, being offered a one-year deal. He made his debut for the club in their opening League Two game of the 2007-08 season, a 4–0 home defeat to Shrewsbury Town on 11 August 2007. He also appeared in an FA Cup match against Nottingham Forest later in the season.

Having been transfer listed by the club's new manager Peter Jackson on 14 January 2008, he departed the club on 25 February after his contract was cancelled by mutual consent.

Corby Town
After leaving Lincoln City, he signed for Corby Town on 26 February 2008. He joined Grantham Town on an initial month's loan in November 2010, the loan being extended to a second month. In January 2011, Corby Town agreed to release Watt to enable him to join Grantham Town on a permanent basis.

Boston United
In January 2013 he joined Boston United, reuniting him with his one-time Corby Town manager Graham Drury. He made his debut in the club's 2-1 Conference North home defeat to Harrogate Town on 8 January 2013. He made 14 appearances for Boston before leaving at the end of the season.

Coalville Town
In July 2013, Watt signed for Coalville Town. He made 12 appearances for Coalville scoring 3 goals.

Belper Town
On 7 October 2013, Watt signed for Belper Town.

Lincoln United
In July 2017 Watt signed for Lincoln United.

Frickley Athletic
In May 2018 Watt signed for Northern Premier League side Frickley Athletic.

References 

1988 births
Living people
People from Rotherham
Association football defenders
English footballers
Lincoln City F.C. players
Grantham Town F.C. players
Corby Town F.C. players
Boston United F.C. players
Coalville Town F.C. players
Belper Town F.C. players
Frickley Athletic F.C. players
Mickleover Sports F.C. players
English Football League players
National League (English football) players
Northern Premier League players
Southern Football League players